Umbonulidae is a family of bryozoans belonging to the order Cheilostomatida.

Genera:
 Aegyptopora Ziko, 1988
 Astochoporella Hayward & Thorpe, 1988
 Desmacystis Osburn, 1950
 Escharopsis Verrill, 1879
 Oshurkovia Grischenko & Mawatari, 2005
 Posterula Jullien, 1903
 Rhamphostomella Lorenz, 1886
 Scorpiodina Jullien, 1886
 Trigonopora Maplestone, 1902
 Umbonula Hincks, 1880

References

Bryozoan families